Nikolai Shumov (born 16 February 1994 in Moscow) is a Russian-born Belarusian cyclist, who most recently rode for UCI Continental team .

In 2018 Shumov was involved in a suspected race-fixing incident in the Grand Prix of Minsk.

Major results

2011
 4th Overall Giro di Basilicata
1st Stage 2
2014
 National Road Championships
1st  Under-23 road race
2nd Road race
2015
 3rd Road race, National Under-23 Road Championships
 4th Overall Tour de Serbie
1st Young rider classification
 4th Grand Prix Sarajevo
 6th Gran Premio della Liberazione
2016
 National Road Championships
1st  Under-23 road race
2nd Road race
 8th Puchar Ministra Obrony Narodowej
2017
 1st  Road race, National Road Championships
 1st Trofeo Città di Brescia
2018
 1st Grand Prix Minsk
 1st Stage 3 Tour of Cartier
 5th Minsk Cup
 6th Grand Prix Side
2019
 1st Grand Prix Velo Alanya
 1st Stage 1 Five Rings of Moscow
 4th Grand Prix Minsk
 6th Horizon Park Race Classic
 6th Memoriał Henryka Łasaka
 10th Grand Prix Justiniano Hotels

References

External links

1994 births
Living people
Belarusian male cyclists
European Games competitors for Belarus
Cyclists at the 2019 European Games
Cyclists from Moscow